A mind is the set of cognitive faculties that enables memory, consciousness, perception, thinking and judgement.

Mind(s) may also refer to:

Arts, entertainment, and media

Music
 "Mind" (song), by The Farm
 "Mind" (Talking Heads song), a song by Talking Heads from their 1979 album Fear of Music
 "Mind", a song by System of a Down from their album System Of A Down

Periodicals
 Mind (journal), the British journal of analytic philosophy
 Microsoft Internet Developer (MIND), a magazine by Microsoft

Other uses in arts, entertainment, and media
 Mind (The Culture), self-conscious, hyperintelligent machines in the novels of Iain M. Banks
 MiND: Media Independence, an Internet television service
 Mind: Path to Thalamus, a 2014 video game
 Minds (social network), an encrypted start-up social media platform backed by Anonymous
 Mothers and Daughters (comics) (Minds), the fourth book in the Mothers and Daughters graphic by Dave Sim, and the 11th collected Cerebus the Aardvark volume

Organizations
 Mind (charity), a mental health charity based in the United Kingdom
 Stichting MIND, a mental health charity based in the Netherlands
 MIND High School, a high school in Montreal, Quebec, Canada
 MIND Institute, a neuroscience research facility at the University of California, Davis
 MINDS, a welfare organisation for the mentally disabled in Singapore

Other uses
 MinD, a protein
 Gottfried Mind (1768–1814), Swiss artist
 The Thunder, Perfect Mind, a Gnostic work

See also
 Brain
 Cognition
 Intelligence
 Mentalese
 Mindfulness (disambiguation)
 Philosophy of mind